ProStores was an e-commerce website hosting company owned by eBay.  Formerly known as Kurant StoreSense, ProStores was acquired by eBay Inc. by the end of 2005 changing the name to ProStores by eBay.

ProStores' feature set included simple wizard-driven website, e-commerce capabilities, site design tools and e-business management. Smaller merchants could also manage the entire process of posting and selling products on eBay using the ProStores interface. It also offered inventory management, supplier communication and integration with Quickbooks and Dreamweaver.

eBay announced on July 1, 2014 that support for the platform would end February 1, 2015.

References

External links 
Prostores homepage

Web hosting